In electronics, Anderson's bridge is a bridge circuit used to measure the self-inductance of the coil. It enables  measurement of inductance by utilizing other circuit components like resistors and capacitors.

Anderson's bridge was invented by Alexander Anderson in 1891. He modified Maxwell's inductance capacitance bridge so that it gives very accurate measurement of self-inductance.

Balance conditions 
The balance conditions for the Anderson's bridge or equivalently the values of the self-inductance and resistance of the given coil can be found using basic circuit analysis techniques such as KCL, KVL and through the use of phasors.
Consider the circuit diagram of Anderson's bridge in the given figure. Let L1 be the self-inductance and R1 be the electrical resistance of the coil under consideration. Since the voltmeter is ideally assumed to have nearly infinite impedance, the currents in branches ab and bc as well as those in the branches de and ec are taken to be equal. Applying Kirchhoff's current law at node d, it can be shown that-

                                   
Since the analysis is being made under the balanced condition of the bridge, it can be said that the voltage drop across the voltmeter is essentially zero. On applying Kirchhoff's voltage law to the appropriate loops(in the anti-clockwise direction), the following relations hold true-
 

On solving these sets of equations, one can finally obtain the self-inductance and resistance of the coil as-

Advantages 
The Anderson's bridge can also be used the other way round- that is, it can be used to measure the capacitance of an unknown capacitor using an inductor coil whose self-inductance and electrical resistance have been pre-determined to a high degree of precision. An interesting point to note is the fact that the measured self-inductance of the coil does not change even on taking dielectric loss within the capacitor into account. Another advantage of using this modified bridge is that unlike the variable capacitor used in Maxwell bridge, it makes use of a fixed capacitor which is relatively quite cheaper.

Disadvantages 
One of the obvious difficulties associated with Anderson's bridge are the relatively complex balance equation calculations compared to the Maxwell bridge. The circuit connections and computations are similarly more cumbersome in comparison to the Maxwell bridge.

References

Measuring instruments
Bridge circuits
Analog circuits
Irish inventions
Impedance measurements